(Sargassum fusiforme, syn. Hizikia fusiformis), sometimes called hiziki, is a brown sea vegetable growing wild on rocky coastlines of East Asia.

Hijiki has been a part of the Japanese culinary sphere and diet for centuries. It is rich in dietary fiber and essential minerals such as calcium, iron, and magnesium. According to Japanese folklore, hijiki aids health and beauty, and thick, black, lustrous hair is connected to regular consumption of small amounts. Hijiki has been sold in United Kingdom natural products stores for 30 years and its culinary uses have been adopted in North America.

Recent studies have shown that hijiki contains potentially toxic quantities of inorganic arsenic, and the food safety agencies of several countries (excluding Japan), including Canada, the United Kingdom, and the United States, have advised against its consumption.

In the West
In 1867 the word "hijiki" first appeared in an English-language publication: A Japanese and English Dictionary by James C. Hepburn.

Starting in the 1960s, the word "hijiki" started to be used widely in the United States, and the product (imported in dried form from Japan) became widely available at natural food stores and Asian-American grocery stores, due to the influence of the macrobiotic movement, and in the 1970s with the growing number of Japanese restaurants.

Appearance and preparation

Hijiki is green to brown in colour when found in the wild. A fisherman and a professional diver harvest the hijiki with a sickle at low tide of the spring tide of May from March. After collection, the seaweed is boiled and dried to be sold as dried hijiki. Dried processed hijiki turns black. To prepare dried hijiki for cooking, it is first soaked in water then cooked with ingredients like soy sauce and sugar to make a dish.

In Japan, hijiki is normally eaten with other foods such as vegetables or fish. It may be added to foods that have been steamed, boiled, marinated in soy sauce or fish sauce, cooked in oil, or added to soup, stir fries or quiches. Hijiki seaweed may be mixed with rice for sushi but is not used as a wrap to prepare sushi.  Konjac (konnyaku) gel in Japan is typically prepared with hijiki mixed in to give it its characteristic grey color and texture.

In Korea, the seaweed is called tot and eaten as namul (seasoned vegetable side dish) or cooked with bap (rice).

Nutrition
Hijiki contains dietary fiber and minerals such as iron, calcium, and magnesium. Dietary fiber is good for the intestine and iron helps to prevent anemia. The ratio of calcium to magnesium in hijiki is 2 to 1.

Arsenic health risk
Several government food safety agencies advise consumers to avoid consumption of hijiki seaweed. Test results have indicated that levels of inorganic arsenic were significantly higher than in other types of seaweed. These results have been independently verified. Government food safety agencies that advise against consumption include the Canadian Food Inspection Agency (CFIA), the Food Standards Agency (FSA) of the United Kingdom, and the United States Department of Agriculture (USDA).

The Ministry of Health, Labour and Welfare of Japan has responded with a report pointing out that while the consumption of more than 4.7 g hijiki seaweed per day could result in an intake of inorganic arsenic that exceeds the tolerable daily intake for this substance, the average daily consumption for Japanese people is estimated at 0.9 g. Several of the reports from other food safety agencies acknowledged that occasional hijiki consumption was unlikely to cause significant health risks but advised against all consumption regardless.

Although no known illnesses have been associated with consuming hijiki seaweed to date, inorganic arsenic has been identified as carcinogenic to humans. Exposure to inorganic arsenic has been linked with gastrointestinal effects, anemia, and liver damage. People who follow a macrobiotic diet that often includes large amounts of seaweed may be at greater risk.

See also
Arsenic poisoning

References

Further reading

External links 
Canadian Food Inspection Agency — Factsheet
Food and Environmental Hygiene Department of Hong Kong — Hijiki and Arsenic
Food Standards Agency of the United Kingdom — Hijiki: your questions answered
New Zealand Food Safety Authority — Hijiki media release
Seaweeds Used as Human Food

Fucales
Japanese condiments
Japanese cuisine terms
Japanese vegetables
Korean condiments
Edible seaweeds